Cruseilles (Arpitan: Corzelyes; Savoyard dialect: Croueselyes) is a commune in the Haute-Savoie department in the Auvergne-Rhône-Alpes region in Southeastern France. In 2019, it had a population of 4,502.

Cruseilles is on the A41 autoroute, 12 km (7.4 mi) south-southeast of Saint-Julien-en-Genevois.

Notable people
Cruseilles is notable as the birthplace of Louis Armand (1905–1971), who served as president of the SNCF and later of Euratom, was a Resistance officer in World War II, before he was elected to the Académie Française in 1963.

See also
Communes of the Haute-Savoie department

References

Communes of Haute-Savoie